Toni Castells is an independent artist and composer. Originally from Barcelona, he resides in London, where he composes, records and performs his own music. In 2007 he naturalised as a British citizen He mixes classical music and operatic elements with loops and beats, a sound ranging from alt-classical down to atmospheric pop. His music is cinematic and dramatic. He produces his seldom large-scale live performances through his own creative agency Interstellar Music. Castells also currently lectures Music Technology at the London College of Music and Imperial College London.

Early Music Career (1980-1993) 
Castells entered music school at the aged 4. Aged 6 Castells was certified as ‘gifted’ and featured in Maria Teresa Gomez Masdevall’s academic book High Capacities in Boys and Girls: detection, identification and integration in school and family. Aged 6 Castells started learning classical guitar as his main instrument while teaching himself to play the piano when practice rooms were empty. He studied clarinet later on his life. Aged 14 Castells went on to study at the Conservatori Municipal de Música de Barcelona, receiving third prize ‘ex-aequo´ at the St. Joan de Vilatorrada Composition Prize with Imatges, an experimental piece for flute and piano. Also aged 14, Castells started his first pop band with friends of his childhood music school playing the keyboards. The band was initially called Korrefok and later changed its name to Herzia. The band got signed in 1998 by Spanish independent label AZ Records. Heriza’s debut album Coses que Passen (AZ Records 1999) was named best Catalan rock album of 1999 by specialised music magazine Popular 1.

La Salle and Music Lan Studios (1994-1999) 
In 1994 Castells was accepted at La Salle University to undertake a BSc in Telecommunications Engineering (Sound and Image Specialisation). After graduating with Distinction, he stayed for a 2-year MEng in Electronic Engineering (Sound and Image Specialisation). In his final year, he was taught Digital Audio by La Salle alumni and studio owner Joan Trayter, founder of Grammy-Award winning Music Lan Studios recording studios in Avinyonet de Puigventós, in Northern Spain. Trayter asks Castells to join Musiclan as an assistant engineer. In Music Lan Studios, Castells learned how to record, mix and produce music from both Trayter and Music Lan co-founder Jordi Solé. During the 2 years Castells stayed at musiclan he worked with many celebrated Catalan and Spanish artists, bands and producers such as Lluís Llach, Peret, Jarabe de Palo, Enrique Bunbury, Loquillo, Andrés Calamaro, Macaco, Ojos de Brujo, Elefantes, Sopa de Cabra, Quimi Portet, Gossos, Micky Forteza-Rey, Suso Sáiz, Jon Caffery. Castells also worked on the album Unsterblich by German punk-rock band Die Toten Horsen.

London and Momo (2000-2009) 
In 2000, Castells moved to London, where he worked as a recording and mixing engineer for José María Cano of the Spanish pop group Mecano. Castells worked on José María Cano's debut solo album JoseCano (Muxxic 2000), recording and editing the lead vocals and mixing the album. In 2002 Castells worked with José María Cano again, recording and mixing the new Centenary Anthem for Real Madrid CF called Hala Madrid!, featuring Plácido Domingo and composed by José María Cano himself to celebrate the Spanish football club's centenary in 2002. In 2001 Castells secured a job as an assistant recording engineer at the Royal College of Music, where he worked until 2006. There, he had the opportunity to work and record the RCM Symphony Orchestra under conductors such as Lorin Maazel, Bernard Haitink and Roger Norrington.

In 2004 Castells started Momo, a music project that merged popular music with classical influences, merging operatic voices with downtempo beats. Momo's debut album Unharmed was released independently on 23 October 2006 and featured soprano Amelia Whiteman and Spanish singer Elisabeth Rodergas (better known as Beth), who had represented Spain at Eurovision in 2003 finishing in eighth position and who famously Terry Wogan referred to as the "Kylie Minogue in dreadlocks". The album also featured Dublin-born singer Roberta Howett, who finished in ninth place in the first UK series of television talent show The X Factor in 2004. The album reached the iTunes Top 20 download charts upon its release. 

Castells premiered a live adaptation of Unharmed at Bush Hall in London on 13 July 2007 in collaboration of the Sacconi Quartet and visual content from British photographer Conor Masterson. During 2007 and 2009 Castells performed the show in the UK and Spain in collaboration with Icelandic photographer Maria Kjartans, performing at The Stables in Milton Keynes, Roxy Bar and Screen in London, FNAC in Barcelona and at the Mercat de Música Viva in Vic, Spain.

Famous Jack (2009-2011) 
In 2009 Toni created his alter ego Famous Jack, according to Castells "a creative vehicle through which to explore new music genres and new ways of performing music". Inspired by British post-punk New Wave artists, American Counterculture singer-songwriters and electro-psychedelic artists such as MGMT, Castells entered the London Gig Circuit. Castells used his own voice and performed solo, sometimes accompanied by a female percussionist. He alternated acoustic and electric guitar, playing over self-made backing tracks and played the harmonica too. He dressed androgynously and featuring gold clothing and face paint.

Throughout 2009 and 2011 he performed at  music venues such as The Dublin Castle, The Water Rats, The Troubadour, 93 Feet East, Hoxton Underbelly, Windmill Brixton, The Bull & Gate, The Cobden Club, Bar Music Hall Shoreditch, Roadtrip Old Street, The Haverstock Arms, 333 Old Street, The Legion, The Garage, The Hope & Anchor, Monkey Chews and The Camden Head. Castells released two studio albums as Famous Jack, Famous Jack (2009) and Superstar (2011).

The London Trilogy (2012-2018) 
The London Trilogy is a body of 3 works created by Castells during 2012 and 2018 inspired by the Law of Impermanence, the First Dharma Seal (primary characteristic or principle) in Buddhist philosophy. The Law of Impermanence is the teaching that everything in material or relative existence is impermanent. That is, everything has a beginning, a middle, and an ending, and that suffering occurs when we do not accept this principle. Castells mentions as inspiration Greek philosopher Heraclitus' quote: “No man ever steps in the same river twice, for it's not the same river and he's not the same man”.

Castells reflects in the trilogy the 3 main phases of this life cycle: birth or expression, growth or experimentation and death or integration/transcendence. Castells states how he uses studio albums as a preparatory phase to create his compositions, using them as sketches and studies of the final compositions. The 3 works of the London Trilogy are created for bespoke mixed ensembles of acoustic instruments, electronics, mixed voices and choir, with each of the pieces having its own unique ensemble configuration. The London Trilogy was not composed in chronological order, first two works reflect on birth and death with the latter work reflecting on life itself.

Life from Light (2012) 
'Light from Life' is a chamber video-opera that premiered at the Union Chapel in London on November 15, 2012. Castells deviates from the traditional operatic form and his compositions largely take the form of an oratorio, including multimedia and video art elements taking inspiration from Steve Reich's video-operas.

‘Life from Light’ was inspired by an eponymous chapter of the 2012 BBC nature documentary series ‘How To Grow A Planet’, in which Professor Iain Stewart describes the mechanisms and evolutionary forces that allowed life to appear on planet Earth, finally paving the way for human civilisation. Castells states that the piece revolves around the Charles Darwin quote "the impossibility of conceiving this immense and wonderful universe, including man with his capacity for looking far backwards and far into futurity, as the result of blind chance or necessity". Thus, the question about our ultimate origin and purpose becomes the central theme of the piece, a question through which Castells explores what it means to be human, our relationship with our planet and the natural world, and on how our actions are creating irreversible damage to both.

The work also features some graphic depictions of sex, as well as lines taken directly from Wikipedia pages on the subject of sex. Sexual reproduction is seen by Castells as central to the evolutionary forces that have forged life and human civilisation. Some observers have seen in the piece the intention of providing a level of sex education that can appeal to youth in different cultures, with the aim of raising awareness on the increasing banalisation of sex and sexual intercourse amongst young people.

'Life from Light' was readapted in 2014 by invitation of Tete-a-Tete Opera and, sponsored by the Arts Council England, was performed over two nights at London's Kings Place Hall One on August 7 and 8, 2014.

2045: The Year Man Becomes Immortal? (2016) 
‘2045: The Year Man Becomes Immortal?’ is a composition for small chamber ensemble, electronics, two voices and choir that premiered at St. James's Piccadilly in London on July 6, 2016. A private performance was held at Cowdray Park on July 9, 2016. Again the composer deviates from the traditional operatic form combining operatic voices with elements of popular music, downtempo electronica and sound art. The piece was written for soprano, countertenor, piano trio and mixed choir and features sonifications of light curves captured by NASA’s Kepler space observatory.

“2045: The Year Man Becomes Immortal” was originally an article published on Time Magazine in 2011 by Lev Grossman. The article features computer engineer and futurologist Ray Kurzweil, Director of Engineering at Google Inc., describing the advent of Technological Singularity, a new era in which man and machine will finally merge allowing us to prolong life indefinitely, effectively making man immortal. Through this paradigm of the future Castells explores our bad relationship with death and the efforts of our technocratic society to overcome it. Through the piece this view is juxtaposed to the one of philosopher Alan Watts who in his teachings argued that in nature's game there's a purpose to dying, that it is not natural for us to wish to prolong life indefinitely and that the idea that death is a terrible thing is a tremendous disease from which our culture in particular suffers. Castells states that the piece allowed him to overcome his own fear of death.

Hhumann X (2018) 
'Hhumann X' is a composition for small chamber ensemble, electronics, two voices and choir that premiered at LSO St. Luke's on 20 October 2018. The composition was inspired by the findings of the Jo Cox Commission on Loneliness published in December 2014 that stated that in the UK over 9 million adults often or always feel lonely. The piece is an exploration of social isolation in an era of technological hyper-connectedness and its premiere featured More Than Just a Choir, a community choir based in North London that works with people suffering from mental illness and social isolation. Castells stated: “I like to raise awareness about the double-edged effects of modernisation upon Western society and loneliness is one of these big issues.”  The premiere received the support of the Central and North West London NHS Foundation Trust.

For the premiere of ‘Hhumann X’ at LSO St Luke's in 2018, Castells collaborated with Spanish pianist José Menor, violinist Harriet MacKenzie and soprano Honey Rouhani. José Menor was nominated the same year for a Latin Grammy Award on the Best Classical Album category for ‘Enrique Granados: Goyescas’ (IBS Classical 2018).

Artistic Collaborations

Plácido Domingo and José María Cano - Real Madrid CF Centenary Anthem (2000-2003) 
In 2002 Castells worked with José María Cano recording and mixing the new Centenary Anthem for Real Madrid CF called Hala Madrid!, featuring Plácido Domingo and composed by José María Cano himself to celebrate the Spanish football club's centenary in 2002.

Noah Stewart - Sting's Field of Gold Spanish Adaptation (2012) 
In 2011, leading classical label Decca Records commissioned Castells to translate Sting’s hit song Fields of Gold into Spanish. The translation was entitled Campos de Oro and was included in American tenor’s Noah Stewart self-titled debut crossover album Noah, which was released in 2012 under Decca Records. Castells also became Noah’s vocal coach for this particular track, which we recorded at Metropolis Studios in London. Noah became the first black musician ever to top the UK Classical Album Chart when his album Noah reached number one and remained there for 7 weeks.

Hayley Westenra - American TV Appearance with Naturaleza Muerta (2013) 
In 2013, Decca Records commissioned Castells to coach crossover artist Hayley Westenra for a forthcoming TV appearance on American TV with Greek tenor Mario Frangoulis to perform a crossover version of Naturaleza Muerta, hit track by Spanish composer José María Cano and first released by Spanish pop band Mecano in 1991.

Catty Pearson - Songwriting for Time Tells Me (2017-2018) 
Through 2017 and 2018 Castells started a writing collaboration with British singer-songwriter Catty Pearson, co-writing some of the songs of her 2018 independently released debut EP ‘Time Tells Me’. The EP was produced by Chris Kimsey, best known for his work producing The Rolling Stones, and recorded at legendary Olympic Sound Studios.

Liam Hodges - Catwalk OST for Mutations in the 4th Dimension (2019) 
In October 2018 British fashion designer Liam Hodges asked Castells to create the soundtrack of Hodge's presentation at London Fashion Week of his 2019 Fall/Winter collection entitled ‘Mutations in the 4th Dimension’ in January 2019. For this Castells worked with one of his collaborators Elliott Liu and soprano Honey Rouhani. Liu reworked and remixed 3 tracks from Hhumann X (Dancing in Space, Hhumann X and The Seeker) and soprano Honey Rouhani sang live during the show.

Cyril de Commarque - Artificialis at the Saatchi Gallery (2019) 
During 2019 Toni collaborated with artist Cyril de Commarque creating the soundscape for his multi-media installation ‘Artificialis’. As part of its special Artist-In-Residency programme, the Saatchi Gallery presented the piece alongside another multi-media installation by Kate Daudy both created as a response to 'Tutankhamun: Treasures of the Golden Pharaoh', which will be displayed at Saatchi Gallery for six months from November to May 2020. Both artists invite the viewer to contemplate notions of legacy and transition. Before coming to London, 'Tutankhamun: Treasures of the Golden Pharaoh' attracted more than 1.3 million visitors in Paris, becoming the most-visited exhibition in French history.

Music, Art and Philanthropy 
Castells has been involved a variety of events that combine music, art and philanthropy. He created Buy Music, Get Art in 2008. For the project, held at Maddox Arts in Mayfair, a work of contemporary art by Norwegian artist based in Los Angeles Edvarda Braanaas entitled Ceci n'est pas Une Fille was sold in shares through a limited edition CD. Another Castells project was Love in the Sky. Launched on June 30, 2009 at the Institute of Contemporary Arts in London, the exhibition featured collaborative works from a collection of artists, which were auctioned off that night to benefit Coram, a charity for underprivileged children. More than £8,000 was raised. He is also the founder of Xmas Rocks for Charity, a fundraising concert that took place in December 2007 at the Notting Hill Community Church to raise money for Depression Alliance and the Mood Foundation.

Discography

References

External links
 Official Website

Spanish composers
Spanish male composers
Living people
1976 births